Krispy Krunchy Chicken, also known as KKC, is an international fried chicken food chain founded in 1989 in Lafayette, Louisiana, by Neal Onebane. It has over 2,600 locations across 47 states in the U.S., American Samoa, Malaysia and Mexico and is often associated with convenience stores and gas stations.

History
Krispy Krunchy Chicken was founded in 1989 by convenience store businessman Neal Onebane, who wanted to offer convenience store food that would appeal to customers. That year, he began frying the signature chicken in the back of one of his convenience stores in Lafayette, Louisiana, and personally delivering it to customers.

With convenience store businessman Dan Shapiro as Krispy Krunchy Chicken's executive vice president, Krispy Krunchy Chicken products increased from being carried in 200 convenience stores to being carried in over 2,200 in 2006. Annual sales were $12.6 million that year.

In 2014, annual sales were $155 million.

In 2017, there were 509 new Krispy Krunchy Chicken stores and a total of 2,294 stores across the United States and in Malaysia and American Samoa.

In June 2018, Krispy Krunchy Chicken opened its first Mexican location at the GoMart Montecarlo mall in Mérida.

Business model
KKC mostly partners with owners of convenience and grocery stores to sell its products. 

Operators of Krispy Krunchy Chicken locations do not pay franchise or royalty fees. Instead, operators pay Krispy Krunchy Chicken to distribute inventory (equipment and graphics) to their stores.

Products
Krispy Krunchy Chicken offers Cajun-style Krispy Chicken, chicken meals, family meals, Cajun Tenders and wings. The family meals include two sides: six honey butter biscuits and an order of family fries. Other sides and snacks include corn dogs, Crispitos, red beans and rice, mac-n-cheese, mashed potatoes and gravy, jambalaya, boudin bites, chicken cracklins and boneless wings.

The company's fried chicken sandwich includes hand-breaded fried chicken, dill pickles and a honey butter spread. In 2020, select locations began offering the sandwich on a sweet butter bun.

The signature chicken marinade is included in the breading of the chicken and also injected directly into the chicken.

The seafood menu includes honey butter fried shrimp and fried fish.

COVID-19 response
In early 2019, Krispy Krunchy Chicken began a partnership with Uber Eats, Grubhub and DoorDash to start its delivery service. During the onset of the COVID-19 pandemic, the company developed offers and discounts for customers using the food delivery apps.

In 2020, Krispy Krunchy Chicken partnered with Jaxson Hayes to provide 500 meals to environmental services crew at Ochsner Health facilities.

See also
 List of fast-food chicken restaurants
 List of fast food restaurant chains

References 

Chicken chains of the United States
Fast-food chains of the United States
1989 establishments in Louisiana
American companies established in 1989
Companies based in Lafayette, Louisiana